The Wright brothers were American inventors of the airplane, Orville (1871–1948) and Wilbur Wright (1867–1912).

Wright brothers or The Wright brothers may also refer to:

People
 Von Wright brothers, Finnish painters
Magnus von Wright (1805–1868)
 Wilhelm von Wright (1810–1887)
 Ferdinand von Wright (1822–1906)
 John and Christopher Wright, Gunpowder Plot conspirators
 Harry Wright and George Wright, baseball players

Places
Dayton–Wright Brothers Airport, airport in Dayton, Ohio, USA
Wright Brothers National Memorial, Kill Devil Hills, North Carolina, USA; the place where the Wrights first flew
Wright Brothers Field, Jezero Crater, Mars; the place where Ingenuity Mars drone helicopter first flew

Other uses
The Wright Brothers (book), 2015 non-fiction book by David McCullough
The Wright Brothers (film), 1971 telefilm
Wright Brothers Memorial Trophy, for public service in aviation in the United States
Wright Brothers Medal for contributions to aerospace

See also

Wright (disambiguation)